The 2009 Carinthian state election was held on 1 March 2009 to elect the members of the Landtag of Carinthia.

The election took place five months after the death of Governor Jörg Haider, long-time leader of the Freedom Party in Carinthia (FPK). He was succeeded by Gerhard Dörfler. The FPK had split from the Freedom Party of Austria (FPÖ) when Haider formed the Alliance for the Future of Austria in 2005, and without its veteran leader, the party's future was uncertain. Nonetheless, Dörfler managed to retain the FPK's position and even increase its voteshare to an all-time high of almost 45%. The opposition Social Democratic Party of Austria (SPÖ) suffered major losses, but remained in second place. The Austrian People's Party (ÖVP) made gains, and The Greens narrowly retained their seats. The FPÖ's new state branch won just 3.8% and failed to enter the Landtag at all.

The FPK managed to secure a majority in the state government for the first time, but was still two seats short in the Landtag. The party subsequently formed a coalition with the ÖVP.

Background
Prior to amendments made in 2017, the Carinthian constitution mandated that cabinet positions in the state government (state councillors) be allocated between parties proportionally in accordance with the share of votes won by each; this is known as Proporz. As such, the government was a perpetual coalition of all parties that qualified for at least one state councillor.

In 2005, then-Governor and former federal leader of the Freedom Party of Austria (FPÖ) Jörg Haider split from the party due to internal disputes, and founded the Alliance for the Future of Austria (BZÖ). The Freedom Party in Carinthia, then the FPÖ's state branch and led by Haider, changed its allegiance and became the Carinthian branch of the BZÖ. The large majority of its leadership and structure followed, with only a small minority defecting to the FPÖ's new Carinthian branch. Shortly after the 2008 federal election, Haider was killed in a car accident. He was succeeded by Gerhard Dörfler, who became the new Governor of Carinthia and leader of the FPK. Dörfler led the party to the 2009 state election under the name "Freedom Party in Carinthia – BZÖ List Jörg Haider". The FPÖ launched a new Carinthian state branch, hoping to challenge the FPK's dominance.

Electoral system
The 36 seats of the Landtag of Carinthia are elected via open list proportional representation in a two-step process. The seats are distributed between four multi-member constituencies. For parties to receive any representation in the Landtag, they must either win at least one seat in a constituency directly, or clear a 5 percent state-wide electoral threshold. Seats are distributed in constituencies according to the Hare quota, with any remaining seats allocated using the D'Hondt method at the state level, to ensure overall proportionality between a party's vote share and its share of seats.

Contesting parties
The table below lists parties represented in the previous Landtag.

In addition to the parties already represented in the Landtag, six parties collected enough signatures to be placed on the ballot.

 Freedom Party of Austria (FPÖ)
 Communist Party of Austria (KPÖ)
 List Strong (STARK)
 Gaddafi Party of Austria (GPÖ)

Results

Results by constituency

References

State elections in Austria
2013 elections in Austria
March 2013 events in Europe